The Communauté de communes de l'Atrébatie was located in the Pas-de-Calais département, in northern France. It was created in January 1999. It was merged into the new Communauté de communes des Campagnes de l'Artois in January 2017.

Composition
It comprised the following 27 communes:

Agnières 
Ambrines  
Aubigny-en-Artois  
Avesnes-le-Comte  
Bailleul-aux-Cornailles  
Berles-Monchel  
Béthonsart 
Camblain-l'Abbé  
Cambligneul  
Capelle-Fermont 
Chelers  
Frévillers 
Frévin-Capelle 
Hermaville  
Izel-lès-Hameau  
Magnicourt-en-Comte 
Maizières  
Manin 
Mingoval 
Noyelle-Vion  
Penin 
Savy-Berlette  
Tilloy-lès-Hermaville 
Tincques  
Villers-Brûlin  
Villers-Châtel  
Villers-Sir-Simon

References 

Atrebatie